The 2017 Delaware State Hornets football team represented Delaware State University in the 2017 NCAA Division I FCS football season. They were led by third-year head coach Kenny Carter and played their home games at Alumni Stadium. They were a member of the Mid-Eastern Athletic Conference (MEAC). They finished the season 2–9, 2–6 in MEAC play to finish in a three-way tie for eighth place.

On November 19, it was announced that head coach Kenny Carter's contract would not be renewed. He finished at Delaware State with a three-year record of 3–30.

Schedule

 Source: Schedule

Game summaries

at Delaware

at Hampton

at West Virginia

Norfolk State

at North Carolina A&T

Howard

South Carolina State

at North Carolina Central

at Savannah State

Morgan State

at Florida State

References

Delaware State
Delaware State Hornets football seasons
Delaware State Hornets football